Pahargarh is a village located in Morena district of Madhya Pradesh, India. It was formerly the headquarters of Pahargarh Estate. The village is the site of the historic Pahargarh Fort.

References

Villages in Morena district
Populated places established in the 1440s